Minot is a city in and the county seat of Ward County, North Dakota, United States, in the state's north-central region. With a population of 48,377 at the 2020 census, Minot is the state's fourth-largest city and a trading center for a large part of northern North Dakota, southwestern Manitoba, and southeastern Saskatchewan. Founded in 1886 during the construction of James J. Hill's Great Northern Railway, Minot is also known as "Magic City", commemorating its remarkable growth in size over a short time.

Minot is the principal city of the Minot micropolitan area, a micropolitan area that covers McHenry, Renville, and Ward counties and had a combined population of 77,546 at the 2020 census.

History

Minot came into existence in 1886, after the railroad laid track through the area. A tent town sprang up overnight, as if by "magic", giving Minot its first nickname, the Magic City, and in the next five months, the population increased to over 5,000, further bolstering the nickname. The town site was chosen by the railroad to be placed on the land of then-homesteader Erik Ramstad. Ramstad was convinced to relinquish his claim and became one of the city leaders. The town was named after Henry D. Minot, a railroad investor, ornithologist and friend of Hill. Its Arikara name is niwaharít sahaáhkat; its Hidatsa name is dibiarugareesh ("Plum Coulee").

The city was incorporated on July 16, 1887. The Minneapolis, St. Paul and Sault Ste. Marie Railroad (Soo Line) later built a line from Valley City to Canada. While initially their plan was to cross the Mouse River at Burlington, local interests and arguments convinced them otherwise; landholders along the new route donated the right-of-way. They reached Minot in 1893.

The tornado picked up Andy Botz's home and hurled it to the ground, killing his wife, breaking Botz's shoulder, and slightly injuring the two Botz children who were in the house.

Minot and its surrounding area were wide open from 1905 to 1920. The population grew rapidly due to railroad construction and availability of unclaimed land. Nearly complete court records of Ward County and Minot document the prevalence and different types of criminal activity, and offer strong support for the epithet "crime capitol of North Dakota". State attorney general William Langer helped clean up the town in 1917–1920, but by the time Prohibition arrived in the 1920s, Minot had become a center of illegal activities associated with the High Third district, exacerbated because the city was a supply hub of Al Capone's liquor smuggling operations. The hotbed of alcohol bootlegging, prostitution, and opium dens that sprang up in the Downtown area soon led people to nickname Minot "Little Chicago". The smugglers used a network of tunnels (some previously built for heating or deliveries) to transport and conceal illicit cargo entering from Canada.

In 1969, a severe flood on the Mouse River devastated Minot. Afterward, the Army Corps of Engineers straightened the river's path through the city and built several flood control structures.

On January 18, 2002, a severe train derailment west of the city sent a gigantic cloud of anhydrous ammonia toward Minot and Burlington. One man died and many of Minot's citizens were sickened and severely injured by the gas, causing one of the worst major chemical accidents of the country. In early 2006, court cases were heard in Minneapolis, Minnesota, against Canadian Pacific Railway, the owner of the derailed train. The anhydrous ammonia spill was the largest such spill in U.S. history. Eric Klinenberg used the incident in his book Fighting for Air: The Battle to Control America's Media as an example of the failure of mass media, specifically local radio stations, to disseminate information in an emergency.

The 2011 Mouse River flood caused extensive damage throughout the Mouse River Valley. On June 21, 2011, KXMC-TV reported that a flood of historic proportions was imminent in the Mouse River Valley, largely due to large dam releases upstream. Around 12,000 people were evacuated. It is estimated that 20% of Minot sustained damage from the flood. This figure includes over 4,100 homes that were in some way affected, 2,376 extensively damaged, and 805 damaged beyond repair. Burlington was also severely damaged during this time.

Geography

Neighborhoods

Minot is commonly divided into three major sections: North Hill, the Mouse River Valley and South Hill. North Hill is the area roughly north of Eleventh Avenue North and Northwest Avenue. South Hill is a broad area south and west of Valley Street and Fifth Avenue South. West of Sixth Street West, South Hill dips sharply to the southwest. South Hill's limits are less clearly defined than North Hill's. Though the neighborhood levels out past 16th Street South, the name South Hill is generally applied to all areas south up to the city limits. Neighborhoods in the Mouse River Valley include Bel Air, Downtown, Eastwood Park, Oak Park and West Minot.

Region
Minot is on the Drift Prairie of northwestern North Dakota. The Mouse River, or Souris River, runs through the city west to east.

Important cities in the region for which Minot is the trading center include Burlington, Velva, Garrison, Stanley, Bottineau, Rugby, and New Town.

Minot is almost entirely land; the Mouse River, its oxbow lakes, and a few creeks take up just 0.14% of the city's area.

The city has several small horseshoe-shaped oxbow lakes within its limits near the river, created by the Mouse's meandering course.

Grid and address system
The city is laid out on a grid-based street system. Streets run north-south and avenues run east-west. Streets are numbered by their block distance east or west of Main Street. Avenues are numbered north and south of Central Avenue. There are four city quadrants (NW, SW, SE, NE) to designate the location of any address. Main Street addresses are designated North and South. Central Avenue addresses are designated East and West. The grid system carries over into the rural areas of Ward County, making the county one of only three that do not follow the statewide grid system (the others are Burleigh County and Grand Forks County).

Mouse River
The Mouse River divides the city approximately in half, north and south. The valley rises to the plains both north and south of the river. Although there are names for certain features of these hills, such as Anthony Hill on South Hill, there are no general names for these topographical features. The northern rise and the plateau north of it are called North Hill and the southern rise and plateau south of it are called South Hill.

Climate

Minot experiences a warm-summer humid continental climate (Köppen: Dwb) in its marginal zone receiving sufficient precipitation for such category. Like Central Asia, it exhibits great temperature variation. Summers range from warm to moderately hot, with frequent thunderstorm activity. Winters are typically bitterly cold and snowy, with high winds and below-freezing temperatures for weeks at a time. Lows below  occur on about 39 days during the winter, while temperatures reach  on 14 days per summer, and in some years reach .

Demographics

2020 census
As of the census of 2020, there were 48,377 people, 20,979 households, and 9,978 families residing in the city. The racial makeup of the city was 85.1% White, 4.2% African American, 2.3% Native American, 2.3% Asian, 0.1% Pacific Islander, 0.6% from other races, and 4.3% from two or more races. Hispanic or Latino of any race were 6.3% of the population.

There were 20,979 households, of which 26.3% had children under the age of 18 living with them, 42.1% were married couples living together, 9.6% had a female householder with no husband present, 4.1% had a male householder with no wife present, and 44.1% were non-families. Of all households 34.9% were made up of individuals, and 11.7% had someone living alone who was 65 years of age or older. The average household size was 2.24.

The median age in the city was 33.8 years. 21.5% of residents were under the age of 18; 65.5% of residents were aged 19-64; and 13% were 65 years of age or older. The gender makeup of the city was 51.9% male and 48.1% female.

2010 census
As of the census of 2010, there were 40,888 people, 17,863 households, and 9,978 families residing in the city. The racial makeup of the city was 90.2% White, 2.3% African American, 3.2% Native American, 0.9% Asian, 0.1% Pacific Islander, 0.6% from other races, and 2.7% from two or more races. Hispanic or Latino of any race were 2.7% of the population.

There were 17,863 households, of which 26.3% had children under the age of 18 living with them, 42.1% were married couples living together, 9.6% had a female householder with no husband present, 4.1% had a male householder with no wife present, and 44.1% were non-families. Of all households 34.9% were made up of individuals, and 11.7% had someone living alone who was 65 years of age or older. The average household size was 2.20 and the average family size was 2.86.

The median age in the city was 33.8 years. 21.1% of residents were under the age of 18; 14% were between the ages of 18 and 24; 26.7% were from 25 to 44; 23.2% were from 45 to 64; and 15% were 65 years of age or older. The gender makeup of the city was 49.3% male and 50.7% female.

2000 census
As of the census of 2000, there were 36,567 people, 15,520 households, and 9,265 families residing in the city. The population density was 2,513.1 per square mile (970.4/km2). There were 16,475 housing units at an average density of 1,132.3 per square mile (437.2/km2). The racial makeup of the city was 93.18% White, 1.34% African American, 2.76% Native American, 0.62% Asian, 0.07% Pacific Islander, 0.49% from other races, and 1.54% from two or more races. Hispanic or Latino of any race were 1.47% of the population.

The most populous ancestry groups in the city are German (40.8%), Norwegian (32.3%), Irish (8.7%), English (5.4%), Swedish (4.2%) and French (3.2%).

There were 15,520 households, of which 28.6% had children under the age of 18 living with them, 46.6% were married couples living together, 10.0% had a female householder with no husband present, and 40.3% were non-families. Of all households 32.5% were made up of individuals, and 12.0% had someone living alone who was 65 years of age or older. The average household size was 2.27 and the average family size was 2.90.

In the city the population was spread out, with 23.2% under the age of 18, 13.3% from 18 to 24, 27.4% from 25 to 44, 20.7% from 45 to 64, and 15.4% who were 65 years of age or older. The median age was 35 years. For every 100 females, there were 93.1 males. For every 100 females age 18 and over, there were 89.0 males.

As of 2000 the median income for a household was $32,218, and the median income for a family was $42,804. Males had a median income of $30,283 versus $20,023 for females. The per capita income for the city was $18,011. About 8.8% of families and 12.8% of the population were below the poverty line, including 16.0% of those under age 18 and 8.9% of those age 65 or over.

Law and government

The mayor of Minot is Tom Ross. As mayor he chairs the 7-member City Council, but only casts a vote to break a tie. City Manager Harold Stewart handles the city's day-to-day affairs.

Minot uses the council–manager system of government. Seven councilmen are elected from 7 city wards to four-year terms. Elections are arranged such that one councilman from each ward is elected every even-numbered year. The mayor is elected to a four-year term as well; the last mayoral election was in 2022. All city offices are nonpartisan.

City elections are held in June in North Dakota, along with the state primary election.

Northwest Area Water Supply

The Northwest Area Water Supply (NAWS) has had disputes with the Canadian government over a plan calling for water to be pumped from Lake Sakakawea, then to Minot for treatment, and then to large stretches of Northwest North Dakota.

Economy

Largest employers

According to the City's 2020 Comprehensive Annual Financial Report, the largest employers in the city are:

ING/ReliaStar established a service center in Minot in December 1998.

Minot has seen a significant increase in population and infrastructure investments in the last several years with the expanding drilling (using hydrofracking) of oil in the Bakken Formation and Three Forks Groups. The State of North Dakota has a website detailing daily oil activity.

Education

The Minot Public Schools system operates ten elementary schools (K–5) in the city: Bel Air, Edison, John Hoeven, Lewis and Clark, Longfellow, McKinley Roosevelt, Perkett, Sunnyside, and Washington. The district also operates Bell Elementary, about five miles southeast of Minot. Jefferson Elementary closed in 2003. The old Washington Elementary building closed in 2007 and the students moved to a new building that was renovated from an old health care center. There are also two elementary schools (K–6) on the Minot Air Force Base: Dakota and North Plains. The 2011 flood resulted in the relocation of Erik Ramstad Middle School and the closure of Lincoln Elementary, as both buildings were damaged beyond economical repair. Longfellow Elementary was expanded after the flood and children who lived in the Lincoln neighborhood then attended Longfellow Elementary. 

There are three middle schools in the system. The two in Minot are grades 6–8: Jim Hill in the south and Erik Ramstad in the north. Memorial Middle School on Minot AFB is named for fallen veterans of the U.S. armed forces. The school was built in the mid-1960s on the base's northern perimeter. All three middle schools were formerly called "junior high" schools.

The city has one public high school, Minot High School, divided between two campuses. A few blocks east of Downtown Minot is Central Campus (grades 9–10), which occupies the original high school building. On the southwest side of the city is the newer Magic City Campus (grades 11–12), constructed in 1973 just west of Jim Hill Middle School. MPS also operates an adult learning center and Souris River Campus, an alternative high school.

In 2021, voters passed a school bond issue to fund renovation of Central Campus in downtown Minot into a third in-town middle school for students in grades 6 to 8. Magic City Campus will be renovated into a four-year high school attended by students in grades 9 to 12. A second four-year high school, Minot North High School, will be in north Minot on the site of the former Cognizant office building, which has been donated to the school district and will be expanded and renovated.

Private schools in Minot include Bishop Ryan Catholic School, which offers preschool through grade 12 at a single campus. There is also a Protestant K–12 school, Our Redeemer's Christian School.

Minot is also home to Minot State University, the state's third-largest university. MSU's campus is at the base of North Hill, just west of Broadway. A two-year teacher's college when it opened in 1913, Minot State became a university in 1987.

Preschool and daycare

Many of the larger daycare centers and preschools in the Minot area work in collaboration with local church groups. There are also programs such as Head Start and preschool programs through Minot Public Schools. The in-home daycare providers are state registered and licensed.

Culture

Minot's arts community includes an art museum, a symphony orchestra, an opera company, a city band, several dance and theater troupes: over 40 organizations claim membership in the Minot Area Council on the Arts.

Nearly 40% of the city's residents are of Scandinavian ancestry, and every October since 1977, Minot has been the host to the Norsk Høstfest, North America's largest Scandinavian-American festival. Scandinavian Heritage Park is located in Minot. Scandinavian Heritage Park features remembrances and replicas from each of the Scandinavian countries: Norway, Sweden and Denmark, as well as Finland and Iceland.

Recreation
The Minot Park District operates seventeen parks with various facilities; Corbett Field, home to American Legion, high school and college baseball; Optimist soccer complex; MAYSA ice arena; the Sertoma Complex which has 8 softball fields; Souris Valley Golf Course, and an indoor tennis complex.

The city's largest parks are Roosevelt Park and Oak Park. Roosevelt Park Zoo is one of the top zoos in the region. Dogs are allowed in Roosevelt Park, a sign is posted at the entrance confirming this. A "bark park" for dogs opened in the summer of 2005.

The North Dakota State Fair is held in July annually, in Minot. Nearly all recreation areas however are closed during the long winters. The local high school hockey teams use the ice rink located in the Fair Grounds. The ice rink is also turned into the location of the rodeo.

Apple Grove Golf Course, and Souris Valley Golf Course are located in Minot.

Sports

The Minot Hot Tots are a Northwoods League baseball team created in 2022. They play their games at Corbett Field.
The Minot Mallards were a Mandak League baseball team from 1917 to 1997 that played their games at Corbett Field.
The Souris Valley Sabre Dogs, an Expedition League baseball team, played their games at Corbett Field.
The Minot Minotauros, an NAHL team, play their games at Maysa Arena.
The Minot Muskies, played one season with the American West Hockey League and played their games at All Seasons Arena.
The Minot Americans were an SJHL hockey club from 1987 to 1994, playing their games primarily at All Seasons Arena.
The Minot Top Guns were an SJHL hockey club from 1994 to 1997, playing their games primarily at All Seasons Arena.
Other semi-professional hockey clubs calling Minot home were the Minot Raiders/Rangers (1975–1977) and the Minot Maple Leafs (1985–1986).
The Minot Skyrockets, a former Continental Basketball Association team, played their games at Minot Municipal Auditorium.
The Minot State Beavers play ice hockey at All Seasons Arena, baseball at Corbett Field, football at Herb Parker Stadium and basketball at the MSU Dome.
The Mouse River Rollers play roller derby at different locations around the city, including the Maysa Arena.
 Minot is home to several municipal sports venues including the All Seasons Arena, Corbett Field, Maysa Arena and the Minot Municipal Auditorium.

Sister cities
Minot maintains a sister city relationship with the Norwegian city of Skien.

The cities share many qualities, including their size, location on river valleys, historical origins, and air force bases.

Media

Minot has several media outlets. KMOT-TV, KXMC-TV and the Minot Daily News report on local news daily. KCJB-AM, KHRT-AM, and Prairie Public have some local news content, but no active journalists.

Radio

Minot is served by 15 radio stations (12 FM, three AM). Bottineau-based Programmer's Broadcasting owns KTZU and KWGO, along with KBTO of Bottineau. Prairie Public Radio operates KMPR FM 88.9, a community broadcaster based in Burlington operates a low-power FM station, and the remainder are nonprofit Christian stations, of which only KHRT is local.

iHeartMedia owns and operates all the commercial stations licensed to Minot itself: KCJB 910 (classic country & talk), KRRZ 1390 (classic hits/talk), KYYX 97.1 (country), KIZZ 93.7 (Top 40), KMXA-FM 99.9 (AC), and KZPR 105.3 (mainstream rock). This concentration of broadcasting in the hands of a single owner has led to criticism.

AM frequencies

 910 KCJB: "91 Country" Country/Talk
 1320 KHRT: "K-Heart" Gospel music
 1390 KRRZ: "Cars" Classic hits
 710 KXMR: "ESPN" Sports talk

FM Frequencies

 88.9 KMPR: Prairie Public Radio
 91.1 K216EE: Real Presence Radio Christian
 91.9 K220GC: Air1 Christian
 93.7 KIZZ: "Z94" Top 40
 94.9 KTZU: "The Zoo" Classic rock
 97.1 KYYX: "97 Kicks" Country
 98.1 KOWW-LP: "The Cowlip" eclectic community broadcaster (Burlington, North Dakota)
 99.9 KMXA-FM: "Mix 99.9" Adult Contemporary
 100.7 KNDL: K-Love Christian
 102.9 KWGO: "W-G-O" Country
 104.1 KSAF-LP: LifeTalk Radio Christian
 105.3 KZPR: "The Fox" Mainstream Rock
 106.9 KHRT: "K-Heart" Christian

Other stations

Additionally, the following stations are not based in Minot, but generally have a clear signal into town:

550 AM KFYR: "K-Fire" from Bismarck (News/Talk/Sports)
710 AM KXMR: ESPN, also from Bismarck (Sports)
1410 AM KDKT: "Fox Sports Radio 1410" also from Bismarck (Sports)
101.9 FM KBTO: "Sunny 101.9" from Bottineau (Country)

Television
Minot has six television stations, most of which have ATSC (digital) transmitters:

KSRE (ATSC RF channel 40); virtual channels 6.1 PBS, 6.2 PBS World, 6.3 Minnesota Channel, 6.4 Lifelong Learning
KMOT (ATSC RF channel 10); virtual channels 10.1 NBC, 10.2 Fox, 10.3 Me-TV
KXMC-TV (ATSC RF channel 13); virtual channels 13.1 CBS, 13.3 The CW
KMCY  (ATSC RF channel 14); virtual channels 14.1 ABC
KNDM (ATSC RF channel 24); virtual channels 24.1 Heroes & Icons

Cable service
Midco provides cable service to the city of Minot and Minot Air Force Base. Souris River Telecommunications provides cable service to other nearby communities.

Print
The principal local newspaper is the Minot Daily News, which publishes six days a week. The Minot Air Force Base also has a weekly newspaper printed, The Northern Sentry. It is a free publication published on Fridays by BHG, Inc. out of Garrison, ND available on the MAFB, as well as the surrounding communities and many locations within Minot. The Minot State University student newspaper Red & Green is published once a week (Thursdays) during the regular school year, but not during the summer months. Morgan Printing produces the Lunch Letter three days a week on a double-sided leaflet. There is one weekly classified-ad publication, the Trading Post, printed by the Minot Daily News. The Bismarck Tribune is available at several outlets in the city, as is The Forum, to a lesser extent.

Transportation

Railroads
The railroads that built Minot remain, though Great Northern is now part of the BNSF Railway and the Soo Line is run by the Canadian Pacific Railway.

Passenger rail transportation is provided on Amtrak's Empire Builder line, connecting Chicago with Portland and Seattle, which stops at the Minot Amtrak station. Trains make a 20-minute refueling and crew change stop in Minot. Westbound trains are scheduled to arrive daily at 8:29 am local time; eastbound trains are scheduled to arrive daily at 9:27 pm.

Highways

Three major U.S. highways run through the city, connecting it to Canada, Montana, and two interstates: US 2, US 52, and US 83.

US 2 runs east-west and is a four-lane divided highway from Minot east to Grand Forks and beyond as well as west to Williston and into Montana. Minot is midpoint along the North Dakota segment of US 2.

US 83 runs north-south through central Minot as Broadway. It is a four-lane divided highway from Minot south to Bismarck and north to Minot Air Force Base. Just north of the main gate at the base, the road reduces to two lanes and crosses the Canada–US border at Westhope, ND, where it becomes Manitoba Highway 83.

US 52 is a two-lane highway that runs southeast-northwest. Southeast from Minot, it follows a slightly circuitous route to Jamestown. US 52 then merges with Interstate 94 (I-94) after Jamestown, heading due east to Fargo. Northwest from Minot, US 52 crosses the Canada–US border at Portal, ND/North Portal, SK, where it becomes Saskatchewan Highway 39.

The Minot Bypass follows alternate alignments of these roads around the city in its northwest and northeast quadrants, with southwest and southeast bypasses in preliminary planning stages.

Airport
Minot International Airport is served by three airlines as well as charters and air taxi service around North Dakota. Delta Air Lines offers up to six daily round trips to Minneapolis International Airport, offering hundreds of daily connections. United Airlines offers four daily round trips to its Denver International Airport hub. Allegiant Air provides up to four weekly round trips to Las Vegas McCarran International Airport and up to five weekly round trips to Phoenix-Mesa Gateway Airport.

Within the city
Automobiles dominate intracity and local area transport. There is limited fixed-route city transit service (Minot City Transit) on weekdays, and flexible-route rural transit service (Souris Basin Transportation) on an occasional basis. Local transit services for the elderly and disabled (Minot Commission on Aging Transit) meet federal guidelines but have 24-hour advance notice requirements.

Pedestrianism in the city is inhibited by several factors; the sidewalk network is poor in many areas of the city, though improving. Automobile drivers take the right of way at all but the best-marked crosswalks, and major points are often separated by relatively large distances and hill slopes. Skateboarding is illegal in streets and on sidewalks (though there is a skating area in Roosevelt Park), and rollerblading is generally disallowed by downtown landowners.

Sites of interest

 Arlene Theater, a performing arts center, where the Mouse River Players perform
 Dakota Territory Air Museum is an aircraft museum near the airport. It contains many war and civilian aircraft.
 Maysa Arena, an all-purpose, year-round skating facility operated by the Minot Park District with three sheets of ice under one roof.
 Scandinavian Heritage Park is home to the Minot Visitor's Center, as well as buildings based on the Scandinavian style of architecture, including a Stave Church. The grounds are home to the Minot's Arts in the Park series.
 Old Soo Depot Transportation Museum, museum and research center in the restored 1912 Soo Line Depot.
 North Dakota State Fair Center, located on the state fairgrounds, is home to many of the city's largest events, including: The North Dakota State Fair, the Norsk Høstfest, the Big One craft show, the KMOT Ag Expo, and the Great Tomato Festival. It also hosts rodeos, and college hockey games.
 Roosevelt Park and Zoo
 Taube Museum of Art, located in the 1906 Union National Bank Building, features exhibit space in the Main Gallery and the Lower Gallery, which change every four to six weeks.

Notable people 

 Josh Duhamel, actor, born and raised in Minot
 Wiz Khalifa, rapper, singer, songwriter and actor, born at the Minot Air Force Base

See also
Minot Why Nots

References

External links

City of Minot
Convention and Visitors Bureau
Minot history (MSU)

 
Cities in North Dakota
Cities in Ward County, North Dakota
County seats in North Dakota
Populated places established in 1886
1886 establishments in Dakota Territory